Gilead is a town in Oxford County, Maine, United States.  Upon incorporation in 1804, it was named for the large quantity of Balm of Gilead trees in the town center.  The population was 195 at the 2020 census.

History 

In the late 1700s, Massachusetts sold land in what is now Maine to encourage the settlement of the area. In 1772, Oliver and John Peabody, of Andover, Massachusetts, and John and Samuel Bodwell of Methuen, Massachusetts, bought 6000 acres above Sudbury Canada. Gilead was first granted as Peabody's Patent. In 1804, there were 20 families and the need for schools, churches, roads and other community necessities had become evident. It was time to raise money to bring this about. The petition was granted on June 23, 1804 and Peabody's Patent became Gilead.

Geography

Gilead is the first town encountered when crossing into Maine from New Hampshire on U.S. Route 2, which is the major road in the town.

Demographics

2010 census

As of the census of 2010, there were 209 people, 98 households, and 59 families living in the town. The racial makeup of the town was 100.0% White. Hispanic or Latino of any race were 1.9% of the population.

There were 98 households, of which 19.4% had children under the age of 18 living with them, 54.1% were married couples living together, 2.0% had a female householder with no husband present, 4.1% had a male householder with no wife present, and 39.8% were non-families. 30.6% of all households were made up of individuals, and 17.4% had someone living alone who was 65 years of age or older. The average household size was 2.13 and the average family size was 2.64.

The median age in the town was 46.5 years. 16.7% of residents were under the age of 18; 5.3% were between the ages of 18 and 24; 26.8% were from 25 to 44; 29.2% were from 45 to 64; and 22% were 65 years of age or older. The gender makeup of the town was 55.5% male and 44.5% female.

2000 census

As of the census of 2000, there were 156 people, 70 households, and 45 families living in the town. The population density was 8.2 people per square mile (3.2/km2). There were 125 housing units at an average density of 6.6 per square mile (2.5/km2). The racial makeup of the town was 98.72% White and 1.28% Native American.

There were 70 households, out of which 28.6% had children under the age of 18 living with them, 51.4% were married couples living together, 8.6% had a female householder with no husband present, and 34.3% were non-families. 25.7% of all households were made up of individuals, and 10.0% had someone living alone who was 65 years of age or older. The average household size was 2.23 and the average family size was 2.61.

In the town, the population was spread out, with 19.2% under the age of 18, 12.2% from 18 to 24, 26.9% from 25 to 44, 29.5% from 45 to 64, and 12.2% who were 65 years of age or older. The median age was 41 years. For every 100 females, there were 108.0 males. For every 100 females age 18 and over, there were 106.6 males.

The median income for a household in the town was $25,000, and the median income for a family was $34,250. Males had a median income of $17,188 versus $15,208 for females. The per capita income for the town was $13,489. About 9.4% of families and 11.4% of the population were below the poverty line, including 13.3% of those under the age of eighteen and 9.5% of those 65 or over.

In popular culture

Gilead is the setting for the movie The Spitfire Grill, though it was actually filmed in Vermont.

Gilead is the town native Mainer Stephen King based the homeland of Roland Deschain on, protagonist of The Dark Tower series.

See also

 Louise Manny: A historian from Gilead.
 Former Gilead Railroad Station

References

External links
 Maine Genealogy: Gilead, Oxford County, Maine

Towns in Oxford County, Maine
Populated places established in 1804
Towns in Maine